Deerlick is an unincorporated community in Mason County, West Virginia, United States. The community once had a post office, which is now closed.

References

Unincorporated communities in Mason County, West Virginia
Unincorporated communities in West Virginia